Fordsbush is a hamlet in the Town of Minden in Montgomery County, New York, United States.

References

Hamlets in New York (state)
Hamlets in Montgomery County, New York